Doris Cove is the 1.3 km wide cove indenting for 600 m the southwest coast of Greenwich Island in the South Shetland Islands, Antarctica south of Oborishte Ridge and northwest of Ephraim Bluff. It is formed as a result of the retreat of Wulfila Glacier in the first two decades of 21st century. Bulgarian topographic survey Tangra 2004/05. The area was visited by early 19th century sealers.

The feature is named after the sea goddess Doris in Greek mythology.

Location
Bulgarian mapping in 2009.

Maps
 L. Ivanov. Antarctica: Livingston Island and Greenwich, Robert, Snow and Smith Islands. Scale 1:120000 topographic map. Troyan: Manfred Wörner Foundation, 2009. 
 Antarctic Digital Database (ADD). Scale 1:250000 topographic map of Antarctica. Scientific Committee on Antarctic Research (SCAR). Since 1993, regularly upgraded and updated

Notes

References
 Doris Cove. SCAR Composite Gazetteer of Antarctica
 Bulgarian Antarctic Gazetteer. Antarctic Place-names Commission. (details in Bulgarian, basic data in English)

External links
 Doris Cove. Copernix satellite image

Coves of Greenwich Island
Bulgaria and the Antarctic